The Bandini 1100 Siluro is a racing car produced from 1947 to 1949 by Bandini Automobili in Forlì, Italy.

The 1100 Siluro was the first Bandini model created expressly for racing. The style and materials were selected for speed, performance and weight-savings. The name Siluro was chosen to acknowledge the aerodynamic shape and was thought to be a good omen for the races. Initially, to reduce weight and simplify repairs, they were not even painted.

The 1100 Siluro first participated in competitions in 1949. These included Italian competitions such as the "Giro dell'Umbria" (Lap of Umbria), the "Pescara Circuit", and the "Senigallia Circuit", as well as more important, internationally recognized events, such as Mille Miglia. It was driven by Richard W. Gent at Watkins Glen in the 1951 Grand Prix, introducing the cars to the auto-sports fans of the United States.

The body
The body had two seats and was made of aluminium.  It was built at the Bandini headquarters in Via Cesare Battisti in Forlì. Small motor-cycle style wheel-guards were fitted, allowing them to remain separate from the body. The overall result is a combination of technology and aerodynamically efficient torpedo styling, as well as being described as having elements from the animal kingdom. Ilario Bandini loved to reiterate that nature had solved very well functional problems that man is only beginning to face. Thus, he said, the grille, designed to direct as much air to the engine without overloading the front section, has the characteristics of enormous nostrils; lights are encased in it as the eyes of a fish, the heat is disposed of using louvers resembling the gills of a shark. In order to reduce weight as much as possible, the tail was very short and round and only the passenger had a door.

The chassis
The frame, a refinement of the 1100 sport frame, is the version developed for competition. The size and weight are reduced significantly.

 Structure and material:  frame of elliptical section tubes, aviation grade steel  
 Suspension:
 Front: Independent, triangles overlapping with shock hydraulic telescopic tilted and springs cylindrical helical coaxial
 Rear: a bridge with two rigid leaf spring semiellittiche inclined
 Braking system:
 Service: hydraulics, drum front and rear
 Parking Mechanical tape, on transmission
 Steering: worm drive
 Wheels: Borrani Ray
 Fuel Tank: 
 Transmission: transmission shaft with central rear differential and halfshaft

The engine
The chassis, designed to accommodate modified Fiat 1100 engines, proved suitable for different engines up to 1500 cc engine capacity.

1100 DOHC version 
 Positioning: forward longitudinal, 4-cylinder in-line
 Displacement: 1089 cc
 Bore and Stroke: 68 mm x 75 mm
 Head: Derived Alfa Romeo 6 adapted to the 4-cylinder engine, 2 inclined valves per cylinder, 2 camshafts controlled by chain and gears
 Power maximum: 
 Fuel system: 2 carburettors
 Lubricate: wet sump with pump gear and vertical cooler on the front
 Cooling: forced liquid with centrifugal pump and cooler on the front
 Gearbox and clutch: 4 speed+ RG, clutch single dry disc
 Ignition and electrical system: coil and distributor battery 12 V and generator

Fiat-Siata 1500 version 
 Positioning: forward longitudinal, 4-cylinder in-line
 Displacement: 1496 cc
 Power maximum: 90 hp 6000 rpm
 Fuel system: 2 carburettors
 Lubrication: wet sump with pump gear and vertical cooler on the front
 Cooling: forced liquid with centrifugal pump and cooler on the front
 Gearbox and clutch: 4 speed + RG, clutch single dry disc
 Ignition and electrical equipment: coil and distributor, battery 12 V and generator
Weight total:

See also
 Ilario Bandini
 Bandini Cars

References

Bandini vehicles
Sports cars